Ozothamnus lepidophyllus (common name scaly-leaved everlasting) is a shrub in the family Asteraceae, native to Western Australia. It is erect,  growing from 0.25 to 0.6 m high with white flowers and grows on loamy, sandy and rocky soils.

The species was described in 1845 by German botanist Joachim Steetz.

References

External links
 Ozothamnus lepidophyllus: images and occurrence data at Atlas of Living Australia

lepidophyllus
Asterales of Australia
Flora of Western Australia
Taxa named by Joachim Steetz
Plants described in 1845